Hyŏngjesan-guyŏk, or Hyŏngjesan District is one of the 18 guyŏk that constitute Pyongyang, North Korea.

Administrative divisions
Hyŏngjesan-guyŏk is divided into 15 tong (neighbourhoods) and 3 ri (villages):

 Chungdan-dong 중당동 (中堂洞)
 Hadan 1-dong 하당 1동 (下堂 1洞)
 Hadan 2-dong 하당 2동 (下堂 2洞)
 Haksan-dong 학산동 (鶴山洞)
 Sangdang-dong 상당동 (上堂洞)
 Simmi-ri 신미리 (新美里)
 Sin'gan 1-dong 신간 1동 (新間 1洞)
 Sin'gan 2-dong 신간 2동 (新間 2洞)
 Sin'gan 3-dong 신간 3동 (新間 3洞)
 Sŏkchŏn-dong 석전동 (石田洞)
 Sŏp'o 1-dong 서포 1동 (西浦 1洞)
 Sŏp'o 2-dong 서포 2동 (西浦 2洞)
 Sŏp'o 3-dong 서포 3동 (西浦 3洞)
 Sŏryong-dong 서룡동 (西龍洞)
 Sŏsan-dong 서산동 (西山洞)
 Ch'ŏnnam-ri 천남리 (川南里)
 Chesal-li 제산리 (弟山里)
 Hyŏngsal-li 형산리 (兄山里)

Mountains
Hyongjesan

References

Districts of Pyongyang